Garry William Beers (born 22 June 1957), known as Garry Gary Beers, is an Australian musician and was the bass guitarist for the new wave rock group INXS.

Career
Garry William Beers was born to Lola (died 2011) and William Beers. William Beers was a front-end loader operator, and Lola worked part-time in a variety of jobs. Garry has an older sister, Kerry. He grew up in the Sydney suburb of Manly and attended The Forest High School. His first band was Legolas Elvin Warrior in 1975, where he played acoustic guitar with school mates, Bill Hucker and Glen Fender.

After nine months of studying acoustic guitar with little improvement, Beers moved over to bass guitar but refused to take further lessons. His inspiration was John Paul Jones of Led Zeppelin, James Jamerson, and Paul McCartney. He met Andrew Farriss and they formed the band Dr Dolphin, which was followed by the Farriss Brothers in 1977. Farriss Brothers became INXS in 1979 with Beers on bass guitar and double bass, Andrew Farriss on keyboards and guitar, Jon Farriss on drums and keyboards, Tim Farriss on lead guitar, Michael Hutchence on lead vocals and Kirk Pengilly on guitar, saxophone and backing vocals. Generally playing bass guitar, Beers' double bass work occurs on some INXS tracks including "By My Side".

In 1989, while on hiatus from INXS, he joined Absent Friends as bass guitarist. Their No. 7 album, Here's Looking Up Your Address (May 1990) spawned the No. 4 hit single, "I Don't Want To Be With Nobody But You". He also plays the guitar, keyboards, ukulele, and is adept at computer programming for song writing and music production. Beers has co-written tracks for INXS including "Listen Like Thieves", "Don't Change", and "Perfect Strangers". From 2008, Beers has been concentrating on his song writing in Los Angeles, as well as the INXS album, Original Sin released on 8 November 2010.

He co-wrote the song "Tangle With Your Mind" with Scott Weiland of Stone Temple Pilots for Weiland's solo CD Happy in Galoshes (2008). In late 2015, Beers formed a new band called Stadium with Irish singer Ciaran Gribbin who was the lead singer for INXS when they announced their retirement from live performance at the end of 2012.

Personal life

Beers was given his double name at school, it was later misprinted on the cover of INXS' 1980 debut album, INXS, as Garry Gary Beers. Very rarely given as Gary, Beers adopted the alternative spelling, which appears on merchandise and personal items such as guitar picks.

Garry and Jourdan Beers married in September 2007. They live in Los Angeles and enjoy volunteering for several animal rescue organisations. They have a pair of twins. Beers also has two daughters from his first marriage to Jodie Crampton, and a son from his short relationship with Shelley Preston.

References

External links
 Official INXS site
 

1957 births
Living people
Australian bass guitarists
Australian expatriates in the United States
INXS members
Absent Friends (band) members
Musicians from Sydney
20th-century Australian musicians
21st-century Australian musicians